Ekaterina Morozova (born 26 March 1991) is a Russian footballer who plays for Yenisey Krasnoyarsk and the Russia national team.

She played for Russia at UEFA Women's Euro 2017.

References

External links
 

1991 births
Living people
Russian women's footballers
Russia women's international footballers
Women's association football defenders
Kubanochka Krasnodar players
FC Zorky Krasnogorsk (women) players
ZFK Zenit Saint Petersburg players
FC Chertanovo Moscow (women) players
Russian Women's Football Championship players
UEFA Women's Euro 2017 players